This List of people associated with the University of Greifswald contains notable alumni and faculty past and present of an institution of higher education founded as early as 1456.

If alumni subsequently worked at Greifswald University, they are listed under staff.

Nobel prize laureates

 Gerhard Domagk (1895–1964), Nobel Prize in Medicine 1939/1947
 Johannes Stark (1874–1957), Nobel Prize in Physics 1919

Staff

Arts and humanities 

 Erhard Albrecht
 Ernst Moritz Arndt, writer and politician, rector of the University of Bonn
 Ernst Bernheim
 Franz Dornseiff, German lexicographer
 Alfred Gomolka, Member of the European Parliament
 Günther Jacoby
 Otto Jahn
 Ulrich von Hutten, humanist
 Victor Klemperer
 Johannes Luther
 Carl August Peter Menzel, architect
 Gabriele Mucchi, artist
 Carl von Noorden
 Johann Gottfried Quistorp, architect, artist
 Johann Philipp Palthen, historian and philologist
 Georg Friedrich Schömann
 Magdalene Siebenbrodt
 Theodor Siebs
 Thomas Thorild, Swedish poet, critic, feminist and philosopher
 Wilhelm Titel, painter
 Johannes Voigt
 Ulrich von Wilamowitz-Moellendorff, classical philologist
 Fritz Curschmann, historian
 Adolf Hofmeister, historian
 Werner Buchholz, historian

Business and law 

 Rudolf Agricola
 Walter Le Coutre
 Jan Degenhardt
 Stefan Habermeier
 Jürgen Kohler
 Lothar Anton Alfred Pernice
 Peter of Ravenna
 Carl Sartorius
 Carl Schmitt, political scientist
 Friedrich Spielhagen
 Bernhard Windscheid, co-writer of the German civil law code

Mathematics and sciences

 Wilhelm Blaschke
 Karl Fredenhagen
 Felix Hausdorff, mathematician
 Hermann Landois, zoologist
 Jakob Meisenheimer, Chemie (1918–1923)
 Gustav Mie, physicist
 Johann Radon
 Michael Succow, Right Livelihood Award laureate
 Horst Völz
 Michael Beuther

Medicine 

 Heinrich Adolf von Bardeleben
 Horst Bibergeil
 Christian Calenus
 Carl Hueter, surgeon
 Gerhardt Katsch
 Friedrich Loeffler, bacteriologist
 Ludwig Mecklinger
 Gerhard Mohnike
 Hugo Karl Anton Pernice
 Ferdinand Sauerbruch, surgeon
 Carl Ludwig Schleich, doctor and writer
 Werner Hosemann

Theology

 Albrecht Alt
 Hermann Cremer
 Gustaf Dalman
 Helmut Echternach
 Joachim Jeremias
 Martin Noth
 Victor Schultze

Students
See also :Category:University of Greifswald alumni

Arts and humanities 

 Bruno Benthien
 Hans Bentzien
 Hans Bunge
 Hans Jürgen Eggers, pre-historian
 Caspar David Friedrich, romanticist painter
 Oskar Manigk, Bildende Kunst
 Leo Wohleb, Klassische Philologie
 Thorsten Zwinger, Bildende Kunst

Business and law 
 Georg Beseler
 Joachim von Bonin
 Walter Serner, dadaist and writer

Mathematics and sciences

 Alexander Koenig
 Sebastian Pflugbeil
 August Friedrich Thienemann
 Käthe Voderberg

Medicine 

 Theodor Billroth, surgeon
 Widukind Lenz, pediatrician, medical geneticist and dysmorphologist
 Otto Gottlieb Mohnike
 Aleksander Majkowski
 Julius Moses, doctor and Member of the Reichstag (SPD)
 Gustav Nachtigal, explorer of Africa
 Ludwik Rydygier, Polish surgeon

Politics
 Otto von Bismarck, first chancellor of the German Empire
 Bernhard von Bülow, chancellor of the German Empire 1900–1909
 Gerhard Krüger, Nazi student leader
 Erich Mix, politician (NSDAP and FDP
 Graf Guido von Usedom, Prussia diplomate

Theology

 Ernst Moritz Arndt, writer and politician
 Hermann Bonnus
 Johannes Bugenhagen, religious reformer
 Arnold Dannenmann
 Johann Friedrich Dieffenbach
 Friedrich Ludwig Jahn
 Gotthard Ludwig Kosegarten
 Gottlieb Mohnike, Theologe und Begründer der Skandinavistik
 Johannes Schmidt-Wodder
 Ernst Wilm

Honorary doctorates

Arts and humanities 

 
 Wilhelm Friese
 Hans Ulrich Gumbrecht (2008), literary theorist at Stanford University
 Terho Itkonen, Fennist
 Wolfgang Koeppen, German writer
 Erik Lönnroth
 Günther Petersen, journalist
 Helmhold Schneider, entrepreneur 
 Ehm Welk (1956), German writer
 Theodore Ziolkowski
 Matti Klinge, historian

Business and law 

 Jacques Delors, former President of the European Commission
 Thomas Heinrich Gadebusch
 Hans-Heinrich Jescheck
 Kjell Åke Modéer

Mathematics and sciences

 Dieter Behrens
 Günter Ecker, plasma physicist
 Klaus Pinkau, plasma physicist
 Volker Storch, zoologist

Medicine 

 Horst Frunder
 Hans-Klaus Zinser
 Hannelore Kohl, wife of Helmut Kohl
 Bengt Scherstén
 Gert Riethmüller
 Hans-Joachim Lindemann
 Jürgen van de Loo
 Dietrich Niethammer
 Jürgen Radomski, chairman of Siemens

Theology

 Bartholomäus Battus
 Erich Gräßer
 Eberhard Jüngel
 Johannes Luther
 Gottlieb Mohnike (1824), Theologe und Begründer der Skandinavistik
 Roderich Schmidt
 Manfred Stolpe, Minister President of Brandenburg, Federal Minister of Germany

Other

 Pope Callixtus III, approved of the founding of a university in Greifswald
 Hans Freyer, Soziologe und Philosoph
 Bengt Lidner, schwedischer Schriftsteller
 Albrecht Giese, Hansekaufmann
 Andreas von Ihlenfeld, Offizier im 30-Jährigen Krieg
 Christiern Pedersen, dänischer Humanist und Schriftsteller
 Franz Seldte, NSDAP-Politiker
 Walter Serner, Essayist, Schriftsteller und Dadaist
 Petrus Vincentius, Rhetoriker, Ethiker, Dialekt und Pädagoge

References

External links

 www.uni-greifswald.de Official website

 
 
 
Greifswald